Down the Ancient Staircase is a 1975 Italian-French drama film directed by Mauro Bolognini.

Cast
 Marcello Mastroianni - Professor Bonaccorsi
 Françoise Fabian - Anna Bersani
 Marthe Keller - Bianca
 Barbara Bouchet - Carla
 Pierre Blaise - Tonio
 Maria Teresa Albani
 Maria Michi
 Paolo Pacino
 Silvano Tranquilli - Professor Rospigliosi
 Charles Fawcett - Doctor Sfameni
 Enzo Robutti
 Ferruccio De Ceresa - Fascist Official in train
 Lucia Bosé - Francesca
 Adriana Asti - Gianna

Plot
In Italy, in 1930, Professor Bonaccorsi, renowned psychiatrist, conducts research on madness in the asylum where he works as a doctor in Tuscany. He has three mistresses: Bianca, his assistant; Carla, a colleague's wife; and Francesca, the wife of the asylum's director.

References

External links

1975 films
1975 drama films
1970s Italian-language films
Films directed by Mauro Bolognini
Films set in Prato
Films set in Tuscany
Films scored by Ennio Morricone
Films produced by Fulvio Lucisano
Italian drama films
1970s Italian films